Sophie Okonedo  (born 11 August 1968) is an English actress and narrator. The recipient of a Tony Award, she has been nominated for an Academy Award, three BAFTA Television Awards, a Golden Globe Award, and a Primetime Emmy Award. She began her film career in the British coming-of-age drama Young Soul Rebels (1991) before appearing in Ace Ventura: When Nature Calls (1995), and Stephen Frears's Dirty Pretty Things (2002).

Okonedo's breakthrough performance came in 2004, when she co-starred in the film Hotel Rwanda as Tatiana Rusesabagina, the wife of Rwandan hotel manager and humanitarian Paul Rusesabagina, portrayed by American actor Don Cheadle. For this role, she became the second Black female Briton to receive a nomination for the Academy Award for Best Supporting Actress at the 77th Academy Awards in 2005. She later received a Golden Globe Award nomination for the miniseries Tsunami: The Aftermath (2006) and BAFTA TV Award nominations for the drama series Criminal Justice (2009) and the television film Mrs. Mandela (2010). Her other film roles include Æon Flux (2005), Skin (2008), The Secret Life of Bees (2008), and Christopher Robin (2018).

On stage, Okonedo starred as Cressida in the 1999 Royal National Theatre production of Troilus and Cressida. She made her Broadway debut in the 2014 revival of A Raisin in the Sun and received a Drama Desk Award nomination for Outstanding Featured Actress in a Play and won the Tony Award for Best Featured Actress in a Play for her portrayal of Ruth Younger.

Early life
Okonedo was born on 11 August 1968 in London, the daughter of Joan (née Allman), a Jewish Pilates teacher who was born in the East End of London, and Henry Okonedo (1939–2009), a British Nigerian who worked for the government. Okonedo's maternal grandparents, who spoke Yiddish, were from families that had emigrated from Poland and Russia. Okonedo was raised in her mother's Jewish faith.

Okonedo was raised in the Chalkhill Estate, part of the Wembley Park district in the London Borough of Brent.

Career
Okonedo trained at the Royal Academy of Dramatic Art. She has worked in a variety of media including film, television, theatre and audio drama. She performed in Scream of the Shalka, a webcast based on the BBC television series Doctor Who as Alison Cheney, a companion of the Doctor. As well as providing the character's voice, Okonedo's likeness was used for the animation of the character. In 2010, Okonedo portrayed Liz Ten (Queen Elizabeth X) in the BBC TV series Doctor Who episodes "The Beast Below" and again briefly in "The Pandorica Opens".

Okonedo played the role of Jenny in Danny Brocklehurst's BAFTA TV Award nominated episode of Paul Abbott's series Clocking Off. She also played the role of Tulip Jones in the film Stormbreaker (2006) and Nancy in the television adaptation of Oliver Twist (2007). She is also known for playing the role of the Wachati Princess in Ace Ventura: When Nature Calls (1995). In October 2017, Michael Caton-Jones stated that, in 1998, he had chosen Okonedo to star in B. Monkey. However, the film's producer, Harvey Weinstein, banned this because the actress did not meet his personal sexual preference.

She was nominated for an Academy Award in the category of Best Supporting Actress for her role as Tatiana Rusesabagina in Hotel Rwanda (2004) and nominated for a Golden Globe Award for a Lead Actress in a Miniseries for her work in Tsunami: The Aftermath (2006).

She played alongside Queen Latifah, Jennifer Hudson, Alicia Keys and Dakota Fanning as May Boatwright, a woman who struggles with depression, in the film The Secret Life of Bees (2008); opposite Sam Neill and Alice Krige as Sandra Laing in Skin (2009); and portrayed Winnie Mandela in the BBC drama Mrs. Mandela broadcast in January 2010.

In 2014 she appeared on Broadway as Ruth Younger in the revival of A Raisin in the Sun. She won the Tony Award, Best Performance by an Actress in a Featured Role in a Play for this role, beating out co-star and fellow nominee Anika Noni Rose. In 2016, Okonedo returned to Broadway in Ivo van Hove's production of Arthur Miller's The Crucible at the Walter Kerr Theatre as Elizabeth Proctor opposite Bill Camp, Tavi Gevinson, Jason Butler Harner, Ciarán Hinds, Jim Norton, Saoirse Ronan, Thomas Jay Ryan and Ben Whishaw. Also in 2016, Okonedo appeared as Queen Margaret in the second season of the BBC's The Hollow Crown, an adaptation of the Shakespearean plays Henry VI, Part I, II, III and Richard III. She performed in the role of Stevie in the 2017 West End revival of the existentialist play The Goat, or Who Is Sylvia?, by Edward Albee. Directed by Ian Rickson and also starring Damian Lewis as Martin, the production's first preview was on 24 March 2017, opening night on 5 April 2017, and final performance on 24 June 2017, at the Theatre Royal Haymarket. 

In May 2013, Okonedo played the role of Hunter in a BBC radio production of Neil Gaiman's Neverwhere, adapted by Dirk Maggs. She portrayed Siuan Sanche in the 2021 television series The Wheel of Time.

Personal life
Okonedo has one daughter, from a relationship she had with Irish film editor Eoin Martin, and lives in Muswell Hill, London. On her heritage, Okonedo has said, "I feel as proud to be Jewish as I feel to be Black" and calls her daughter an "Irish, Nigerian Jew". As of 2023, Okonedo is married to Jamie Chalmers, who is a builder and with whom she is the stepmother of his two children.

Honours
Okonedo was appointed Officer of the Order of the British Empire (OBE) in the 2010 Birthday Honours and Commander of the Order of the British Empire (CBE) in the 2019 New Year Honours, both for services to drama.

Filmography

Film

Television
{| class="wikitable sortable"
! Year
! Title
! Role
! class="unsortable" | Notes
|-
| 1993
| Age of Treason
| Niobe
| TV movie
|-
| 1995
| The Governor
| Moira Levitt
| 6 episodes
|-
| rowspan=3| 1996
| Staying Alive
| Kelly Booth
| 12 episodes
|-
| Murder Most Horrid
| Rachel
| Episode: "Dead on Time"
|-
| Deep Secrets
| Honey
| TV movie
|-
| rowspan=2| 2000
| In Defence
| Bernie Kramer
| 4 episodes
|-
| Never Never
| Jo Weller
| rowspan=2| TV movie
|-
| 2001
| Sweet Revenge
| Ellen
|-
| rowspan=2| 2002
| Clocking Off
| Jenny Wood
| 5 episodes
|-
| Dead Casual
| Donna
| TV movie
|-
| rowspan=4| 2003
| The Inspector Lynley Mysteries
| Eve Bowen
| Episode: “In the Presence of the Enemy”
|-
|  Spooks
| Amanda Roke
| 1 episode; uncredited
|-
| Alibi
| Marcey Burgess
| TV movie
|-
| Doctor Who: Scream of the Shalka
| Alison Cheney
| Voice role;6 episodes
|-
| 2004
| Whose Baby?
| Karen Jenkins
| rowspan=3| TV movie
|-
| 2005
| Born with Two Mothers
| Lucretia Bridges
|-
| rowspan=2| 2006
| Celebration
| Sonia
|-
| Tsunami: The Aftermath
| Susie Carter
| rowspan=3| Miniseries
|-
| rowspan=2|2007
| Oliver Twist
| Nancy
|-

| Racism: A History
| Narrator
|-
| rowspan=2| 2009
|  Father & Son
| Connie Turner
| Miniseries; 4 episodes
|-
| Criminal Justice
| Jackie Wolf
| Miniseries; 5 episodes
|-
| rowspan=2| 2010
| Mrs. Mandela
| Winnie Mandela
| TV movie
|-
| Doctor Who
| Liz Ten
| 2 episodes: "The Beast Below" and "The Pandorica Opens"
|-
| 2011
| The Slap
| Aisha
| Miniseries
|-
| 2012
| Sinbad
| Razia
| Episode: “Queen of the Water-Thieves”
|-
| rowspan=2|2013
| Mayday
| Fiona
| rowspan=2| Miniseries
|-
| The Escape Artist
| Margaret 'Maggie' Gardner
|-
| 2015
| The Stranger on the Bridge
| Narrator
| TV movie
|-
| rowspan=2|2016
| Undercover
| Maya Cobbina
| Miniseries
|-
| The Hollow Crown: The Wars of the Roses
| Margaret, Queen Consort of England
| Miniseries; 3 episodes
|-
| rowspan=2| 2017
| Thailand: Earth’s Tropical Paradise
| rowspan=2| Narrator
| rowspan=2| Documentary
|-
| Concorde: A Supersonic Story
|-
| 2018
| Wanderlust
| Angela Bowden
| 4 episodes
|-
| 2019–2020
| Flack
| Caroline
| 12 episodes
|-
| 2019
| Chimerica
| Tessa Kendrick
| 4 episodes
|-
| rowspan=4| 2020
|  Criminal: UK
| Julia Bryce
| 1 episode
|-
|  Ratched
| Charlotte Wells
| 3 episodes
|-
| His Dark Materials
| Xaphania
| Voice role; 4 episodes
|-
| Alien Worlds
| Narrator
| Documentary
|-
| rowspan=3| 2021
|  Modern Love
| Liz
| Episode: “Second Embrace, With Hearts And Eyes Open”
|-
| Britannia
| Hemple
| Season 3
|-
|  The Wheel of Time| Siuan Sanche “The Amyrlin Seat”
| Episode: “The Flame of Tar Valon”
|-
| rowspan=2| 2022
|  Slow Horses| Ingrid Tearney
|
|-
|  Inside No. 9| Katrina
| Episode: "Nine Lives Kat"
|}

Theatre

Awards and nominations
 Film and Television 

 Hollywood Film Festival
 2008, Ensemble Acting of the Year (The Secret Life of Bees ), winner
 NAACP Image Awards
 2005, Outstanding Supporting Actress in a Motion Picture (Hotel Rwanda ), nominated
 2007, Outstanding Actress in a Television Movie/Mini-Series (Tsunami: the Aftermath ), winner
 2009, Outstanding Supporting Actress in a Motion Picture (The Secret Life of Bees ), nominated
 2010, Outstanding Actress in a Motion Picture (Skin ), nominated
 Screen Actors Guild Awards
 2005, Outstanding Performance by a Female Actor in a Supporting Role (Hotel Rwanda ), nominated
 2005, Outstanding Ensemble in a Motion Picture (Hotel Rwanda'' ), nominated

Theatre

Audio

Notes

References

External links
 
 
 
 
 

1968 births
20th-century British Jews
20th-century English actresses
21st-century British Jews
21st-century English actresses
Actors from Wembley
Actresses from London
Alumni of RADA
Audiobook narrators
English Ashkenazi Jews
Black British actresses
Black Jewish people
Commanders of the Order of the British Empire
English film actresses
English people of Nigerian descent
English people of Polish-Jewish descent
English people of Russian-Jewish descent
English television actresses
English voice actresses
Jewish English actresses
Living people
People from Muswell Hill
Theatre World Award winners
Tony Award winners